Suezichthys is a genus of wrasses native to the southeastern Atlantic Ocean through the Indian Ocean to the Pacific Ocean.

Species
The currently recognized species in this genus are:
 Suezichthys arquatus B. C. Russell, 1985 (rainbow slender wrasse)
 Suezichthys aylingi B. C. Russell, 1985 (crimson cleaner fish)
 Suezichthys bifurcatus  B. C. Russell, 1986 (striped trawl wrasse)
 Suezichthys caudavittatus  (Steindachner, 1898) (spottail wrasse)
 Suezichthys cyanolaemus B. C. Russell, 1985 (bluethroat rainbow wrasse)
 Suezichthys devisi (Whitley, 1941) (gracilis wrasse)
 Suezichthys gracilis  (Steindachner & Döderlein (de), 1887) (slender wrasse)
 Suezichthys notatus  (Kamohara, 1958) (northern rainbow wrasse)
 Suezichthys ornatus  (Carmichael, 1819)
 Suezichthys rosenblatti  B. C. Russell & Westneat, 2013 (spotted rainbow wrasse)
 Suezichthys russelli  J. E. Randall, 1981 (Russell's wrasse)
 Suezichthys soelae  B. C. Russell, 1985 (Soela wrasse)

References

 
Labridae
Marine fish genera
Taxa named by J. L. B. Smith